Gevorik Poghosyan (born March 13, 1984, in Yerevan, Armenia) is an Armenian weightlifter. He won a gold medal at the 2010 European Weightlifting Championships.

References

External links 
 Gevorik Poghosyan at Lift Up

1984 births
Living people
Sportspeople from Yerevan
Armenian male weightlifters
European champions in weightlifting
European champions for Armenia
European Weightlifting Championships medalists
21st-century Armenian people